Barahachhetra (also Barahakshetra or Varahakshrata) is a Hindu and Kirat piligram site which remains between the confluence of Koka and Koshi rivers in Barahakshetra, Sunsari of Koshi Province, Nepal. This place is one of Nepal's oldest shrines mentioned in Puranas including Brahma Purana, Varaha Purana and Skanda Purana and even mentioned and glorified in the Mahabharata epic. In Barahachhetra, the Varah, an incarnation of Vishnu is worshiped. Barahachhetra is one of the Char Dham in Nepal.

This place is located at about 5 km North West from Dharan in Sunsari district. The present appearance of the original temple of Barahachhetra was made in 1991 BS. The temple was rebuilt by Juddha Shamsher for the last time in 1991 BS after the temple was demolished by the earthquake of 1990 BS. There are 9 temples including that of Laxmi, Panchayan, Guruvarah, Suryavarah, Kokawarah and Nageshwar and many hospices in Barahachhetra. Statues of more than 1500 years old have been found in this place.

Pilgrims come all seasons but special fete is organised in occasions of kartik purnima and makar sakranti. People from India prefer to come Barahachhetra in kartik purnima and people from hilly Nepal generally come at makar sakranti. Except this, huge number of pilgrims arrive at rishi panchami, byas panchami, fagu purnima and other ekadashis or other fasts and festive days. Each day seems like a fete due to regular flow of people.

Lord Vishnu, by taking the incarnation of Varaha or Baraha protected the earth from being submerged into Patala (underworld) with his long tusk. Then the Lord sat with his wife Laxmi at the bank of Koshi River in the lap of Himalayas and hills. So, the place bore its name after that event. There is a big and beautiful image of the Baraha incarnation of Lord Vishnu.

Kumbha Mela

Nepal is the World's Fifth Destination of Kumbha Mela. In every twelve years, a semi-Kumbha Mela has been organizing since 2058 B.S. in Chataradham, Sunsari. The second event was held in 2070 B.S. for the duration of a month. More than 600,000 people visited for Kumbha Asnan in the Koshi in the year 2070.

References

External links

Populated places in Sunsari District
Char Dham temples in Nepal